Sonia Paquette (born 7 February 1973 in Saint-Janvier-de-Joly, Quebec) is a Canadian retired track and field athlete who specialised in the 100 metres hurdles. She represented her country at the 1996 Summer Olympics and the 1993 World Championships without qualifying for the semifinals.

She has personal bests of 13.11 seconds in the 110 metres hurdles (1996) and 8.26 seconds in the 60 metres hurdles (Ghent 1999).

She also took part in surf lifesaving competitions.

Competition record

References

External links
 
 
 
 
 

1973 births
Living people
Canadian female hurdlers
Olympic track and field athletes of Canada
Athletes (track and field) at the 1996 Summer Olympics
People from Chaudière-Appalaches
Universiade medalists in athletics (track and field)
Universiade bronze medalists for Canada
World Athletics Championships athletes for Canada
Medalists at the 1997 Summer Universiade
Competitors at the 1993 Summer Universiade
Competitors at the 1995 Summer Universiade
Competitors at the 1999 Summer Universiade